General Jean Baptiste Marie Edouard Campenon (5 May 1819 in Tonnerre – 16 March 1891 in Neuilly-sur-Seine) was a French general and politician.

Life
He studied at the École spéciale militaire de Saint-Cyr, graduating on 1 October 1840 as a sous-lieutenant. He took part in the Crimean War, the French conquest of Algeria, campaigns in China and the Franco-Prussian War. A friend of Gambetta, he was minister for war several times in 1881, then in 1883 and 1885. He then became a sénateur inamovible. He also secretly translated The Perfumed Garden.

Bibliography 

 G. Vapereau, «Campenon, Jean Baptiste Marie Edouard » in Dictionnaire Universel Des Contemporains, Paris : Hachette, 1880. (p. 10) 

1819 births
1891 deaths
People from Tonnerre, Yonne
French Ministers of War
French generals
French life senators
Politicians of the French Third Republic